Patrick Hiban, also known as Pat Hiban (born in 1965), is the founder and former  Chairman of Rebus University and is the former host and founder of real estate podcast Real Estate Rockstars with Pat Hiban, which has featured guests including Robert Kiyosaki and Shark Tank's Barbara Corcoran.

Hiban is a former real estate agent out of the Baltimore MD area, and was the owner of the Pat Hiban Group with Keller Williams. As a billion-dollar agent, Hiban was awarded #1 REMAX Agent by gross commissions in the world in 2004 and #1 Keller Williams Realty Agent in units sold nationwide 2006. He was named a New York Times and USA Today best selling author, and has been quoted in Time Magazine, the Washington Post, the Baltimore Sun, and various other real estate publications.

Hiban is also one of the founders of GoBundance, an adventure company for "healthy, wealthy, generous individuals who choose to lead epic lives". Notable members of GoBundance include fellow founders David Osborn and Tim Rhode.

Early life and education 
Hiban and his four siblings grew up in Howard County, Maryland. His mother, Ann, was a schoolteacher. In his own words, Hiban came from "fairly humble beginnings." He didn't begin speaking until the age of 5, and was diagnosed with a learning disability as a child. Hiban's parents divorced when he was 12. According to Hiban, as a child he ostensibly didn't possess any "special talents" or "strong interest in doing anything particular." Hiban graduated from Wilde Lake High School in 1983. In 1987, he earned his sociology degree from Frostburg State University, graduating with a GPA of 2.6.

In the summer before his senior year of college, Hiban first had a "realization that [he] had a skill" when he got a new job distributing coupons for a timeshare company in Ocean City, Maryland. In his first day on the job, Hiban made more money in commissions than he typically made in an entire week at his previous job, where he worked as a meat slicer at a local deli. Hiban views this experience as a defining moment that put him on a path toward entrepreneurship.

Career

Rebus University 
Rebus University is an online real estate training resource as part of Hiban's goal to "disrupt the way that traditional real estate is taught", with guest instructors who are active and successful within the real estate industry, including Hiban himself. Guest instructors include Keri Shull and Daniel Lesniak, Chantel Ray, Jeff Cohn, and others.

Podcast: Real Estate Rockstars with Pat Hiban 
Hiban has hosted Real Estate Rockstars with Pat Hiban with over 600 episodes since its launch in 2014. Real Estate Rockstars with Pat Hiban was sold in November 2019 for an undisclosed amount, announced on episode 20 of the Property Business Podcast with Lena Benjamin on Tuesday 26 November.

Podcast Accolades 
Real Estate Rockstars with Pat Hiban has been named a "Top Podcast" by the following companies:

 Lab Coat Agents: "Top 5 Real Estate Podcasts You Should Be Listening To For 2018!"
 Web4Realty: "Top Ten Podcasts for Real Estate Agents"
 Placester: "20 Fantastic Real Estate Podcasts You Need To Listen To Today"
 FitSmallBusiness: "Top 12 Real Estate Podcasts for Top Producers"
 BuildingBetterAgents: "Best Real Estate Podcasts"

Bibliography

6 Steps to 7 Figures: A Real Estate Professionals Guide to Building Wealth and Creating Your Destiny, 2011 (#6 on the New York Times Best Seller List, #2 on the USA Today Best Seller List, #1 on Barnes and Noble, and #2 on the Amazon Best Seller List).
Tribe of Millionaires:   What if One Choice Could Change Everything, 2019 
The Quitter's Manifesto:  Quit a Job You Hate for the Work You Love, 2022

Philanthropic Work

Children of Incarcerated Parents (CHIP) Mentor (2012–present)
Make A Wish Child Ambassador (2012 - 2016)
1 Life Fully Lived Success Mentor (present)

Awards and articles
Pat Hiban named New York Times Best Selling Author
Pat Hiban was the #1 RE/MAX Agent Worldwide in 2004.
Pat Hiban was the #1 Keller Williams Realty Agent Worldwide in 2006
Pat Hiban is featured in a testimonial in David Osborn's Wealth Can't Wait (2017)

References

1965 births
Living people
American real estate brokers
People from Columbia, Maryland
American male writers